"Shadrach" is a song by rap trio Beastie Boys from their album Paul's Boutique. Released on October 30, 1989, it was the second and final single released from the album.

The song refers to the Biblical story of Shadrach, Meshach, and Abednego and the fiery furnace in the Book of Daniel. However, the lyrics "Shadrach, Meshach, Abednego" in the track are used and sampled from Sly Stone's "Loose Booty", where they are repeated and spoken rhythmically throughout the track in an almost rap-like form. In verse two, the lyric, So I'm out pickin' pockets at the Atlantic Antic, refers to an annual Brooklyn street festival of that name.

The drum beat is a loop from the song “Hot & Nasty” by Black Oak Arkansas and played by drummer Tommy Aldridge.

Also in the song is a reference to the AC/DC album For Those About to Rock (We Salute You), in the lyrics "For those about to rock we salute you".

The video released to promote the Beastie Boys' song was directed by Adam Yauch under his pseudonym Nathaniel Hornblower.  Its style and artistic beauty (each frame was painted by hand) resulted in it being included in the 22nd International Tournée of Animation. The video can be seen on the Beastie Boys Criterion Collection DVD set. The music video was designed by famous animation studio Klasky Csupo.

Also released on the EP An Exciting Evening at Home with Shadrach, Meshach and Abednego.

Track listing

Samples
The sources of the song's samples can be found on WhoSampled.
"Say What?" by Trouble Funk
"That's the Joint" by Funky 4+1
"Do Your Dance" by Rose Royce
"Never Let 'Em Say" by Ballin' Jack
"Funky Drummer" by James Brown
"Hot and Nasty" by Black Oak Arkansas
"Sugarhill Groove" by the Sugarhill Gang
"Loose Booty" by Sly Stone

Notes
 Produced & arranged by the Beastie Boys & the Dust Brothers.
 Engineered by Mario Caldato & Allen Abrahamson.
 Samples taken from Sly Stone's "Loose Booty", from his 1974 album Small Talk.

References

1989 singles
1989 songs
Beastie Boys songs
Songs written by Ad-Rock
Songs written by Mike D
Songs written by Adam Yauch
Songs written by John King (record producer)
Songs written by Michael Simpson (producer)
Capitol Records singles
Shadrach, Meshach, and Abednego
Song recordings produced by Mario Caldato Jr.
Song recordings produced by Dust Brothers